Richard's Wedding is a 2012 comedy/drama film written, edited, and directed by Onur Tukel.  Among the film's ensemble cast are actors Josephine Decker, Randy Gambill, Lawrence Michael Levine, Jennifer Prediger, and Tukel himself.

The film premiered at the 2012 Sarasota Film Festival.

Cast
Thomas J. Buchmueller as Simon
Josephine Decker as Phoebe
Dustin Guy Defa as Taco
Jamie Dobie as Deedee
Randy Gambill as Louis
Heddy Lahmann as Amy
Lawrence Michael Levine as Richard
Theresa Lu as Lyndsey
Oona Mekas as Kristin
Jennifer Prediger as Alex
Darrill Rosen as Darrill Rosen
Adam Schartoff as Andrew
Onur Tukel as Tuna

Release

Media
The film was released on VOD through Devolver Digital.

Reception

Critical response
The film received a generally mixed response from critics.  David DeWitt of The New York Times called the film "a slice of the John Cassavetes, John Sayles and Richard Linklater life" and added "Richard’s Wedding is modest in umpteen ways, and if your cinematic diet craves the substantial, be forewarned. But the film’s DIY ethos has a heart, which makes the script’s small talk about humanity not so small after all."  Ronnie Scheib of Variety added, "Turkel constantly undermines the feel-good with the ridiculous and vice versa, vacillating between infantile insults and professions of affection, a duality that ultimately wears thin. Still, if the message sometimes veers uncomfortably toward sententiousness, it reaches its comic apogee in Alex’s born-again ex-junkie cousin Louis (Randy Gambill), now an online-ordained minister. Proffering thought-provoking questions about the nature of friendship and demanding crack with equal sweetness, his helpfulness and obliviousness run neck and neck."

Conversely, Michael Atkinson of The Village Voice viewed the film very unfavorably, calling it "A handheld New York indie that dallies in the queasy DMZ between hipster-narcissism and a self-satisfied critique of hipster-narcissism".  Kenji Fujishima of Slant Magazine gave the film a more mixed 2 out of 4 stars, saying "Richard's Wedding may be admirably nervy in some ways, but in the director's preference for above-it-all contempt over tough-minded empathy, the film ends up seeming little more than an 89-minute hatefest, with no special insights into human nature to make the endeavor worthwhile."

References

External links

Films directed by Onur Tukel
2012 films
2012 comedy-drama films
Films shot in New York (state)
Films shot in New York City
2012 comedy films
American comedy-drama films
2010s English-language films
2010s American films